Teracotona clara is a moth in the family Erebidae. It was described by William Jacob Holland in 1892. It is found in Burundi, Ethiopia, Kenya, Rwanda, Tanzania and Uganda.

Subspecies
Teracotona clara clara (Kenya and Tanzania)
Teracotona clara rubiginea (Toulgoët, 1977) (Ethiopia)

References

Moths described in 1892
Spilosomina